Proprioseiopsis cannaensis is a species of mite in the family Phytoseiidae.

References

cannaensis
Articles created by Qbugbot
Animals described in 1962